Halil Rural District is a rural district (dehestan) in the Central District of Jiroft County, Kerman Province, Iran. At the 2006 census, its population was 5,856, in 1,343 families. The rural district has 43 villages.

References 

Rural Districts of Kerman Province
Jiroft County